The Bright, the Blue and the Beautiful is an album by American jazz pianist Ahmad Jamal featuring performances recorded in 1968 and released on the Cadet label.

Critical reception
Allmusic awarded the album 2 stars.

Track listing
 "Wild Is the Wind" (Dimitri Tiomkin, Ned Washington) – 2:38   
 "Ballad for Beverly" (Bob Williams) – 3:24   
 "Of Bass I Love" (Ahmad Jamal, Jamil Sulieman) – 2:40   
 "Yesterdays" (Otto Harbach, Jerome Kern) – 2:40   
 "I Wish I Knew (How It Would Feel to Be Free)" (Billy Taylor, Dick Dallas) – 2:47   
 "At Long Last Love" (Cole Porter) – 2:50   
 "Never Let Me Go" (Jay Livingston, Ray Evans) – 2:23   
 "Gypsies in the Wind" (Williams) – 2:55   
 "Lover Man" (Jimmy Davis, Ram Ramirez, James Sherman) – 2:48   
 "By Myself" (Howard Dietz, Arthur Schwartz) – 3:00

Personnel
Ahmad Jamal – piano
Jamil Sulieman – bass
Frank Gant – drums
The Howard Roberts Choir – vocals
Hale Smith – conductor

References 

Cadet Records albums
Ahmad Jamal albums
1968 albums